Lutheran South Academy is a private pre-kindergarten through 12th grade Lutheran school affiliated with the Lutheran Church–Missouri Synod located in Houston, Texas, United States. It is a member of the Houston Area Independent Schools, a group of roughly 50 private, parochial and independent institutions in the Greater Houston area.

History
In 1949, the Lutheran Education Association of Houston (LEAH) opened its first campus, Lutheran High School, at 6901 Woodridge in Houston, Texas. In 1982, as the Houston area continued to grow, Lutheran High School was closed and split into two campuses administered by LEAH. One of the schools, Lutheran High School North, was opened on 1 October 1980 at 1130 W. 34th Street on the north side of the city. The other campus, Lutheran High School South, was opened at 7703 South Loop East, near the intersection of the 610 Loop and I-45. As the need for land grew in order to continue expansion, the decision was made for the school to relocate. In 1998, the Lutheran High School South campus was moved to 12555 Ryewater Drive on the south side of Houston. As expansion of the new campus continued, the school's name was changed to Lutheran South Academy with the addition of Lower and Middle school facilities.

On March 5, 2012, Lutheran South Academy was awarded "Exemplary School" status by  Christian Williams and National Lutheran Schools Accreditation Commission, one of seven Lutheran schools to receive the award in the United States, and the first in Texas.

Campus
The Lutheran South Academy campus consists of five main buildings.

 Building "A" houses the high school (grades 9-12).
 Building "B" includes the cafeteria, gymnasium, athletic office and administrative offices.
 Building "C" houses the lower school (grades PreK-5).
 Building "D", the newest building on campus, houses the middle school (grades 6-8). Construction began on the building in 2007 and it was opened for the 2009-2010 school year.

Athletics

High school
 Baseball (boys)
 Basketball (boys and girls)
 Cheer (girls)
 Cross country (boys and girls)
 Football (boys)
 Soccer (boys and girls)
 Softball (girls)
 Swimming (boys and girls)
 Tennis (boys and girls)
 Track and field (boys and girls)
 Volleyball (girls)

Middle school
 Baseball (boys)
 Basketball (boys and girls)
 Cheer (girls)
 Cross country (boys and girls)
 Football (boys)
 Soccer
 Softball (girls)
 Track and field (boys and girls)
 Volleyball (girls)
 Tennis (boys and girls)
 Swimming (boys and girls)
 Golf (boys and girls)

School uniforms
Students are required to wear school uniforms.

See also

 Christianity in Houston

References

External links
 Lutheran South Academy website

Private K-12 schools in Houston
Schools affiliated with the Lutheran Church–Missouri Synod
Lutheran schools in Texas
Christian schools in Houston
1982 establishments in Texas
Educational institutions established in 1982